A frequently asked questions (FAQ) list is often used in articles, websites, email lists, and online forums where common questions tend to recur, for example through posts or queries by new users related to common knowledge gaps. The purpose of a FAQ is generally to provide information on frequent questions or concerns; however, the format is a useful means of organizing information, and text consisting of questions and their answers may thus be called a FAQ regardless of whether the questions are actually frequently asked.

Since the acronym FAQ originated in textual media, its pronunciation varies. FAQ can be pronounced as an initialism, "F-A-Q", or as an acronym, "FAQ". Web designers often label a single list of questions as a "FAQ", such as on Google Search, while using "FAQs" to denote multiple lists of questions such as on United States Treasury sites. Use of "FAQ" to refer to a single frequently asked question, in and of itself, is less common.

Origins
While the name may be recent, the FAQ format itself is quite old. For example, Matthew Hopkins wrote The Discovery of Witches in 1648 as a list of questions and answers, introduced as "Certain Queries answered" . Many old catechisms are in a question-and-answer (Q&A) format. Summa Theologica, written by Thomas Aquinas in the second half of the 13th century, is a series of common questions about Christianity to which he wrote a series of replies. Plato's dialogues are even older.

On the Internet
The "FAQ" is an Internet textual tradition originating from the technical limitations of early mailing lists from NASA in the early 1980s. The first FAQ developed over several pre-Web years, starting from 1982 when storage was expensive. On ARPANET's SPACE mailing list, the presumption was that new users would download archived past messages through FTP. In practice this rarely happened, and the users tended to post questions to the mailing list instead of searching its archives. Repeating the "right" answers became tedious, and went against developing netiquette. A series of different measures were set up by loosely affiliated groups of computer system administrators, from regularly posted messages to netlib-like query email daemons. The acronym FAQ was developed between 1982 and 1985 by Eugene Miya of NASA for the SPACE mailing list.
The format was then picked up on other mailing lists and Usenet newsgroups.
Posting frequency changed to monthly, and finally weekly and daily across a variety of mailing lists and newsgroups.
The first person to post a weekly FAQ was Jef Poskanzer to the Usenet net.graphics/comp.graphics newsgroups.
Eugene Miya experimented with the first daily FAQ.

Modern developments

Non-traditional FAQs 
In some cases, informative documents not in the traditional FAQ style have also been described as FAQs, particularly the video game FAQ, which is often a detailed description of gameplay, including tips, secrets, and beginning-to-end guidance. Rarely are videogame FAQs in a question-and-answer format, although they may contain a short section of questions and answers.

Over time, the accumulated FAQs across all Usenet newsgroups sparked the creation of the "*.answers" moderated newsgroups such as comp.answers, misc.answers and sci.answers for crossposting and collecting FAQ across respective comp.*, misc.*, sci.* newsgroups.

In web design 
The FAQ has become an important component of websites, either as a stand-alone page or as a website section with multiple subpages per question or topic. Embedded links to FAQ pages have become commonplace in website navigation bars, bodies, or footers. The FAQ page is an important consideration in web design, in order to achieve several goals of customer service and search engine optimization (SEO), including

 reducing the workload of in-person customer service employees
 improving site navigation
 increasing the visibility of the website by matching/optimizing for specific search terms
 linking to or integrating within product pages.

Criticism
Some content providers discourage the use of FAQs in place of restructuring content under logical headings. For example, the UK Government Digital Service does not use FAQs.

References

External links

Original USENET examples
FAQ definition, Jargon7767819960
Frequently Asked Questions
Frequently Asked Questions And Answer

 
Technical communication
Initialisms